Cheonggu High School is a high school in Daegu, South Korea. The flower that symbolizes the school is a forsythia, and the school's symbolic tree is a juniper.

Notable alumni
 Park Chu-Young

External links
Official website

Educational institutions with year of establishment missing
High schools in Daegu
Boys' schools in South Korea